"The Pursuit" is a song by Canadian rock band Evans Blue. It was released on 21 May 2007, as the first single from the band's second album, The Pursuit Begins When This Portrayal of Life Ends. It was accompanied by a music video, directed by Jesse Ewles. The song peaked at #32 on US Modern Rock and #17 on US Mainstream Rock. It was released on iTunes on July 10, 2007.

Track listing

Charts

References

External links
Official Evans Blue MySpace

2007 singles
Hollywood Records singles
2007 songs
Evans Blue songs